Benedicto Crespo Facorro is a psychiatrist and professor of psychiatry with the School of Medicine at the Hospital Universitario Virgen del Rocío,  Universidad de Sevilla, in Seville. Facorro is notable for his research work in the area of early psychosis and schizophrenia and for having led one of the first early psychosis early intervention programs in Spain (PAFIP) for over two decades. Facorro is one of the only four researchers from Spain listed in the authors' collaborative network of the authors that published the greatest number of research papers on antipsychotics and schizophrenia over the last 50 years.

Life  
In 1997 Crespo-Facorro achieved a Doctor of Medicine with a doctorate in Psychiatry from Complutense University. From 1997 to 2000 Crespo-Facorro worked as a postdoctoral researcher at the University of Iowa  working on clinical and biological research on schizophrenia.

Crespo-Facorro is currently Director of the Mental Health Department at Hospital Universitario Virgen del Rocío  (Seville) (2019-), Professor in the faculty of medicine at University of Seville, Adjunct Professor of Psychiatry at University of Milan; and Adjunct professor of Psychiatry at Baylor University, Texas, USA; and Honoris Causa Professor at the Universidad Favaloro Argentina.

From 2016 to 2021 was the Coordinator of the National Schizophrenia Program of the Spanish Psychiatric Research Network (CIBERSAM). He is a Full Member of the Royal Academy of Medicine of Cantabria where he was Vice President and Scientific Director of the IIS Valdecilla-IDIVAL (Santander) (2017–2019).

Editor
Crespo-Facorro is editor-in-chief of the Revista de Psiquiatria y Salud Mental.

Selected publications 

A list of Crespo-Facorro's most important papers:

References

External links
 Articles and citations list 

Spanish psychiatrists
Academic staff of the University of Seville
Year of birth missing (living people)
Living people
Complutense University of Madrid alumni
Academic journal editors